Xanağalı (also, Xanagahlı and Khanagaly) is a village and municipality in the Barda Rayon of Azerbaijan.  It has a population of 565.

References

Populated places in Barda District